Derek Parra (born March 15, 1970) is an American inline skater and speed skater from San Bernardino, California, who graduated from Eisenhower High School in Rialto, California, in 1988. Parra won two medals at the 2002 Winter Olympics, held in Salt Lake City, Utah.

Career
Parra's most successful season was from 2001 to 2002. At the 2002 Winter Olympics, he took the gold in the 1500 meters, an event in which he had been expected to do well but faced a deep pool of competition. Before that, he won the silver in the 5000 meters being bested by Jochem Uytdehaage of the Netherlands. He has worked part-time in Home Depot's gardening department in West Valley City, Utah. In his book, Reflections in the Ice, Parra recounts pursuing his dream of becoming an inline skater at 17, working at McDonald's in Tampa, Florida, and being so poor he had to eat out of the trash.

Parra was selected to take over as U.S. speed skating national all-around coach for the 2010 Olympics.

He appears in a Restore Our Future television ad endorsing Republican Mitt Romney in the 2012 U.S. presidential election and spoke at the 2012 Republican National Convention. Parra became friends with Romney when he was president of the Salt Lake City Olympic organizing committee.

Records

Personal records

World records 

Source: SpeedSkatingStats.com

References

External links
 Derek Parra's U.S. Olympic Team bio ... with notes, quotes, photos
 Derek Parra at SpeedSkatingStats.com

1970 births
Living people
American male speed skaters
American roller skaters
Speed skaters at the 2002 Winter Olympics
Speed skaters at the 2006 Winter Olympics
Medalists at the 2002 Winter Olympics
Olympic gold medalists for the United States in speed skating
Olympic silver medalists for the United States in speed skating
World record setters in speed skating
American sportspeople of Mexican descent
Sportspeople from San Bernardino, California
Pan American Games medalists in roller skating
Pan American Games gold medalists for the United States
Pan American Games silver medalists for the United States
Pan American Games bronze medalists for the United States
World Allround Speed Skating Championships medalists
World Single Distances Speed Skating Championships medalists
Competitors at the 1995 Pan American Games
Medalists at the 1995 Pan American Games
20th-century American people
21st-century American people